Niccolò Ammaniti is an Italian writer, winner of the Premio Strega in 2007 for As God Commands (also published under the title The Crossroads).

He became noted in 2001 with the publication of I'm Not Scared (Io non ho paura), a novel which was later made into a movie directed by Gabriele Salvatores.

Biography
Niccolò Ammaniti was born in Rome. He studied Biological Sciences at university, and though he did not complete his degree, his first novel, Branchie (published by Ediesse in 1994, and then by Einaudi in 1997), drew on his unfinished dissertation. In 1999, Branchie was adapted into a movie with the same title. In 1995 Ammaniti and his father Massimo published the essay Nel nome del figlio. In 1996 he appeared with his sister in the low-budget movie Growing Artichokes in Mimongo.

A short novel written with Luisa Brancaccio for the anthology Gioventù Cannibale edited by Daniele Brolli came out in 1996, as did a collection of short stories, Fango.

In 1999 the novel Steal You Away (Ti prendo e ti porto via), was published and in 2001 I'm Not Scared (Io non ho paura), which won the 2001 Viareggio Prize and was adapted into a film directed by Gabriele Salvatores in 2003.

In 2006, he published As God Commands (Come Dio comanda), which won the Strega Prize. The novel was adapted into a movie, once again by Gabriele Salvatores.

In 2009, he published Let the Games Begin (Che la festa cominci), and in 2010 Me and You (Io e te), which was later adapted into a movie directed by Bernardo Bertolucci. The script, co-written by Bertolucci, Ammaniti, and others, was nominated for Best Screenplay at the 2013 David di Donatello awards and at the 2013 Italian Golden Globe.

In 2015, he published the novel Anna.

List of works
Branchie, Roma, Ediesse, 1994. ; Torino, Einaudi, 1997. .
Ti prendo e ti porto via, Milano, Mondadori, 1999. .
Io non ho paura, Torino, Einaudi, 2001. .
Come Dio comanda, Milano, Mondadori, 2006. .
Che la festa cominci, Torino, Einaudi, 2009. .
Io e te, Torino, Einaudi, 2010. .
Anna, Torino, Einaudi, 2015. .

References

External links
 

1966 births
Living people
Writers from Rome
20th-century Italian novelists
20th-century Italian male writers
21st-century Italian novelists
Strega Prize winners
Viareggio Prize winners
Italian male novelists
21st-century Italian male writers
Ciak d'oro winners